Protocadherin-24 is a protein that in humans is encoded by the PCDH24 gene.

Interactions
PCLKC has been shown to interact with MAST2.

References

Further reading